Magin is both a surname and a given name. Notable people with the name include:

Surname:
Alik Magin, Australian rules footballer
Miłosz Magin (1929–1999), Polish composer and pianist
Rhys Magin (born 1989), Australian rules footballer

Given name:
Magín Berenguer (1918–2000), Spanish archaeologist
Magin Catalá (1761–1830), Spanish missionary

See also
Magin, Iran, a village in Ilam Province, Iran
Saint Maginus